The Onze d'Or (alternative name: Onze Mondial European Footballer of the Year) is an association football award given by French magazine Onze Mondial since 1976. The award honors the best player in Europe, with any player in a European league eligible. Since 1991, there has also been a vote for the best coach of the year.

Onze Mondials readers select their ideal team of the season, Onze de Onze ("Onze's eleven"), and among those players they choose the top three, who receive the Onze d'Or ("Golden Onze"), Onze d'Argent ("Silver Onze"), and Onze de Bronze ("Bronze Onze") respectively. The awards were based on the previous calendar year until 2009, but moved to a seasonal format beginning with the 2010–11 season.

Lionel Messi is the only player to have won the award on four occasions (2009–2012, 2018). Only two other players have won the Onze d'Or three times: Michel Platini (1983–1985) and Zinedine Zidane (1998, 2000–2001). At the 20th anniversary of the magazine in 1995, a Super Onze d'Or was chosen among the previous winners; the top five players selected were: 1. Michel Platini (74%), 2. Marco van Basten (10%), 3. Diego Maradona (5%), 4. Roberto Baggio (4%) and 5. Romário (3%).

Winners

Coach of the Year

Wins by coach

See also 

 The Guardian 100 Best Male Footballers in the World
World Soccer Player of the Year
 FourFourTwo Player of the Year 
El País King of European Soccer
ESM Team of the Season

References
Notes

Citations

French football trophies and awards
European football trophies and awards 
France 3
Awards by magazines
Awards established in 1976
1976 establishments in France